Quinton Arnaz Dial (born July 21, 1990) is a former American football nose tackle. He played college football at Alabama, and was drafted by the San Francisco 49ers in the fifth round of the 2013 NFL Draft. He has also played for the Green Bay Packers.

High school career
He attended Clay-Chalkville High School, where he played for the Clay-Chalkville Cougars high school football team. He was named as the 2008 ASWA's 6A Defensive Lineman of the Year. He was selected to the second-team All-State honors from The Birmingham News. He was ranked as the 33rd defensive tackle prospect by Rivals.com.

College career

He played College football at East Mississippi Community College for his freshman and sophomore seasons. He spent his junior and senior seasons the University of Alabama. In his final two seasons at the University of Alabama, He finished with a total of 46 tackles, 2.5 sacks.
His ferocity of play was illustrated by a hit he made on Georgia quarterback, Aaron Murray, on January 12, 2012.  During another victory for Nick Saban's Alabama team, the Georgia quarterback threw an interception and, for the duration of that play, he became a blocker.  Quinton Dial recognized the opportunity and blocked the Georgia quarterback.

Professional career

San Francisco 49ers
On April 27, 2013, Dial was selected in the fifth round of the 2013 NFL Draft by the San Francisco 49ers. On August 27, 2013, he was placed on the reserve/non-football injury list. During his rookie season in 2013, he played 3 games making 1 tackle. He helped the 49ers reached the NFC Championship game where they lost to the eventual Super Bowl champ Seattle Seahawks. In 2014, he gained more playing time as a defensive tackle and played 14 games making 30 tackles with 2 sacks and 1 pass defended. In 2015, he started 15 games with 59 tackles, 2.5 sacks, and 1 pass defended.

On February 24, 2016, Dial signed a three-year contract extension with 49ers.

On September 2, 2017, Dial was released by the 49ers.

Green Bay Packers
On September 5, 2017, Dial signed with the Green Bay Packers.

NFL career statistics

Regular season

References

External links

Green Bay Packers bio
San Francisco 49ers bio
Alabama Crimson Tide bio

1990 births
Living people
American football defensive ends
American football defensive tackles
Alabama Crimson Tide football players
East Mississippi Lions football players
People from Andalusia, Alabama
People from Clay, Alabama
Players of American football from Alabama
San Francisco 49ers players
Green Bay Packers players